Gondi Kondaiah Ananthasuresh is an Indian mechanical engineer and Professor at the Department of Mechanical Engineering, Indian Institute of Science, Bengaluru, India. He is best known for his work in the areas of Topology optimization, Compliant mechanism and Micro-Electro-Mechanical Systems (MEMS).

He is also currently serving as the chairman of Mechanical Engineering (ME) Department at Indian Institute of Science. He was formerly the chairman of Centre of Biosystems Sciences and Engineering (BSSE) at Indian Institute of Science.

He is the recipient of Shanti Swarup Bhatnagar Award in 2010 for Engineering Sciences.

Biography
Ananthasuresh did his B.Tech in Mechanical engineering from IIT Madras and obtained MS  in Mechanical engineering from University of Toledo in the years 1989 and 1991, respectively. He received his PhD degree in Mechanical engineering in 1994 from University of Michigan. He was a Post-doc at Massachusetts Institute of Technology.  Before moving to India he was faculty at University of Pennsylvania from 1996 to 2004.

Currently he heads the Multidisciplinary and Multi-scale Device and Design Lab (M2D2)  at Indian Institute of Science, Bengaluru.  He has advised 18 PhD students and 30 master's students so far.

See also
Topology optimization
Compliant mechanism

References

Academic staff of the Indian Institute of Science
IIT Madras alumni
University of Toledo alumni
University of Michigan College of Engineering alumni
1967 births
Living people
Engineers from Andhra Pradesh
Indian mechanical engineers
People from Anantapur district
20th-century Indian engineers
Recipients of the Shanti Swarup Bhatnagar Award in Engineering Science